Heinrich Bolten-Baeckers (1871–1938) was a German playwright, screenwriter, film director and producer. He worked on a number of films during the silent era. Towards the end of his film career he directed comedies for UFA such as The Gentleman Without a Residence and The Second Mother.

Selected filmography

Director
 My Leopold (1914)
 My Leopold (1919)
 King Krause (1919)
 The Love of Marion Bach (1919)
 Doctor Klaus (1920)
 Hasemann's Daughters (1920)
 My Leopold (1924)
 The Gentleman Without a Residence (1925)
 The Second Mother (1925)

References

Bibliography
 Kreimeier, Klaus. The UFA Story: A History of Germany's Greatest Film Company. University of California Press, 1999.

External links

1871 births
1938 deaths
Film people from Saxony
People from Chemnitz
German male writers